The Cohens and the Kellys in Scotland is a 1930 American comedy film. It is one of The Cohens and Kellys series, and is also the series' first sound film. It was directed by William James Craft  and produced and released by Universal Pictures.

The film and trailer are preserved in the Library of Congress collection.

Cast
George Sidney - Cohen
Charles Murray - Kelly
Vera Gordon - Mrs. Cohen
Kate Price - Mrs. Kelly
E. J. Ratcliffe - McPherson
William Colvin - McDonald
Lloyd Whitlock - Prince
John McDermott - *uncredited

References

External links

1930 films
American comedy films
1930 comedy films
Films set in Scotland
Universal Pictures films
Scotland
American black-and-white films
Films directed by William James Craft
American sequel films
1930s American films